Paryphanta watti is a species of large predatory land snail, a terrestrial  pulmonate gastropod mollusk in the family Rhytididae.

Distribution 
This species occurs in New Zealand

Description 
The width of the shell is up to 49.6-61.2 mm.

Ecology 
Snails are hatched from eggs with calcareous shell about 5–7.3 months after laying. Newborn snails live 2.8 months underground.

The documented lifespan of Paryphanta watti is 4.1 years.

Conservation 
This species is protected by the Wildlife Act 1953.

See also
 Paryphanta busbyi
 Paryphanta

References

External links 
 New Zealand Department of Conservation Threatened Species Classification

Rhytididae
Taxa named by Arthur William Baden Powell